Parc station, also known as Park Avenue station and formerly Jean-Talon station, is a historic railway station building in Montreal, Quebec, Canada. Its western end currently houses the Montreal Metro's Parc station, while businesses occupy the rest of the building. Although the main building no longer serves the railway, the Exo commuter rail Parc station is adjacent to it. It is located on Jean-Talon Street at the end of Park Avenue in the Park Extension neighbourhood of the borough of Villeray–Saint-Michel–Parc-Extension.

The station was built by the Canadian Pacific Railway in 1931. Its traffic declined in the 1950s and it closed in 1984 when Via Rail transferred service to lines headed into Montreal Central Station. The City of Montreal purchased the building and the western end was converted as a metro station and the remainder of the building was adapted for business use. It currently houses a Joe Fresh outlet.

History
The Canadian Pacific Railway built the Park Avenue station, which was designed by architect Colin Drewitt and opened in 1931. It was inaugurated in the presence of Camillien Houde, the mayor of Montreal at the time. Park Avenue station replaced the Mile End railway station, which was located near the corner of Saint Laurent Boulevard and Bernard Street.

In its time, all trains headed toward Quebec City, Ottawa and the Laurentians, including Le Petit Train du Nord, travelled through Park Avenue Station.

The station's role as an important railway stop permitted the station to host many important figures. One such event occurred in 1939, when the station was the site of a royal visit by King George VI and his wife Queen Elizabeth, who were accompanied by Prime Minister William Lyon Mackenzie King.

Park Avenue station was an important stop for railway passengers until the early 1950s. Following the closure of Place Viger in 1951, Park Avenue station suffered a swift decline in traffic. It was closed itself in 1984 when Via Rail Canada transferred the southern terminal of the Montreal-Quebec City (Sainte-Foy) via Trois-Rivières train service from Windsor Station to Montreal Central Station. The same year, the city of Montreal acquired the building and ceded part of the building to the Montreal Urban Community for the construction underground of the Montreal Metro's Parc station, which opened in 1987. In 1997, Exo's commuter rail station opened, using the name Jean-Talon; but this was later changed in 2000 to Parc in order to avoid confusion with the Jean-Talon Metro station.

The central portion of the building became an Indigo Books and Music store, which closed and was replaced by a Société des alcools du Québec store, which itself closed in 2010.

Current use
The central portion of the building currently houses a Joe Fresh outlet. The Montreal Metro's Parc station occupies the western end of the building. Adjacent is the separate Parc commuter rail station.

Montreal Metro station

Parc station serves the Blue Line of the Montreal Metro. It is operated by the Société de transport de Montréal (STM).

The Metro station was built after the city purchased Jean-Talon station in 1984, and opened in 1987. The entrance was built in and under the building's far west end, with the entrance in the former men's smoking room. It is a normal side platform station. The platform level features a frieze by Huguette Desjardins, and the skylight at the foot of the stairs to the exit contains a sculpture called Métamorphose d'Icare by Claire Sarrasin, an homage to the local Greek community.

Commuter trains

The Exo commuter rail operates a station immediately adjacent to the historic building. Parc station is part of Exo's Saint-Jérôme line. The Exo station's platforms are built along the main line; the space between the old Jean-Talon railway station building and the railway line, where the original platforms were located, is now occupied by a Maxi & Cie.

Connecting bus routes

Nearby points of interest
 CLSC Parc Extension
 IGA Stadium
 Jarry Park

See also 
 OPUS card

References

External links
 Parc station on STM website
 Montreal by Metro, metrodemontreal.com
 2011 STM System Map
 Metro Map
  Parc Commuter Train Station Information (RTM)
  Parc Commuter Train Station Schedule (RTM)

Art Deco architecture in Canada
Art Deco railway stations
Blue Line (Montreal Metro)
Exo commuter rail stations
1997 establishments in Quebec
Canadian Pacific Railway stations in Quebec
Disused railway stations in Canada
Landmarks in Montreal
Railway stations in Montreal
Railway stations closed in 1983
Railway stations in Canada opened in 1931
Railway stations in Canada opened in 1997
Villeray–Saint-Michel–Parc-Extension